Mateo Levato (born 7 June 1996) is an Argentine professional footballer who plays as a forward for Deportivo Morón.

Career
Levato had a youth stint with Douglas Haig. His first taste of senior football arrived in 2016 with Torneo Federal C and Torneo Federal B's Argentino Pergamino, scoring two goals across twelve fixtures in the latter as they suffered relegation back down. In 2017, Levato completed a move to Primera B Nacional side Los Andes. He made his professional league bow on 17 July against San Martín, which was followed by his opening goal for the club two weeks later in a draw away to Estudiantes. After six appearances off the bench, Levato started for the first time in a match with Guillermo Brown in October 2018.

After relegation in 2018–19, Levato spent the 2019–20 campaign out on loan in Primera B Metropolitana with Flandria. His first appearance arrived on 13 October against Deportivo Armenio, before scoring his opening goal for them against parent club Los Andes on 11 November. More goals followed versus Defensores Unidos, Talleres (2), Acassuso, Almirante Brown and Sacachispas in a season that was ended early due to the COVID-19 pandemic.

On 1 July 2021, Levato joined Deportivo Morón.

Personal life
Levato is the nephew of former professional footballers Diego and Mauricio, who both played in the Primera División with Los Andes in the early 2000s.

Career statistics
.

References

External links

1996 births
Living people
People from Pergamino
Argentine footballers
Association football forwards
Primera Nacional players
Primera B Metropolitana players
Club Atlético Los Andes footballers
Flandria footballers
Deportivo Morón footballers
Sportspeople from Buenos Aires Province